Eagles are large birds of prey.

Eagles may also refer to:

Music
 Eagles (band), an American rock band formed in 1971
 Eagles (album), the Eagles' debut album from 1972
 Eagles (box set), a box set by the Eagles
 The Eagles (rhythm and blues group), a 1950s American vocal group
 The Eagles (UK band), a British quartet

Film and television
 Eagles (1984 film), an Iranian film
 Eagles (2012 film), an Israeli film
 Eagles (TV series), a 2019 Swedish television series

Sports teams

National teams
 Qasioun Eagles, nickname for the Syria national basketball team
 The Eagles ("Die Adler"), a nickname for the Germany national football team
 The Eagles ("Orły"), a nickname for the Poland men's national basketball team
 USA Eagles, the United States national rugby union team

Regional teams
 American Eagles, the sports teams of American University, Washington, D.C.
 Ateneo Blue Eagles, the sports teams of Ateneo de Manila University in Quezon City, Philippines
 BCM U Pitești, a Romanian basketball team
 Bedford Town F.C., an English football team known as the Bedford Town Eagles
 Boston College Eagles, the sports teams of Boston College
 Colorado Eagles, a Central Hockey League team located in Loveland, Colorado
 Coppin State Eagles, the sports teams of Coppin State University
 Crystal Palace F.C., an English football team based in South London known as the Eagles
 Eagles cricket team, a South African cricket team based in Bloemfontein
 Eagles women's cricket team, a Zimbabwean cricket team based in Harare
 Eastern Michigan Eagles, the sports teams of Eastern Michigan University
 Eastern Washington Eagles, the sports teams of Eastern Washington University
 Eintracht Frankfurt, an association football team in Germany known as Die Adler (The Eagles)
 Embry–Riddle Aeronautical University, an intercollegiate athletic conference team
 Florida Gulf Coast Eagles, the sports teams of Florida Gulf Coast University
 Georgia Southern Eagles, the sports teams of Georgia Southern University
 Hanwha Eagles, a professional baseball team in South Korea
 Manly-Warringah Sea Eagles, an Australian rugby league football team
 Marquette Golden Eagles, the sports teams of Marquette University
 Mashonaland Eagles, a Zimbabwean cricket team based in Mashonaland
 Morehead State Eagles, the sports teams of Morehead State University
 Newcastle Eagles, a British basketball team
 Niagara Purple Eagles, the sports team of Niagara University
 North Carolina Central Eagles, the sports teams of North Carolina Central University
 North Texas Eagles, former name of the North Texas Mean Green
 Northern Eagles, an Australian former rugby league football club
 Northern Virginia Eagles, an American rugby league team
 Oral Roberts Golden Eagles, the sports teams of Oral Roberts University
 P.A.O.K., a Greek multi-sport club known as the double-headed eagles
 PFC Ludogorets Razgrad, a Bulgarian association football club
 Philadelphia Eagles, a National Football League team
 Sheffield Eagles, a Rugby league team based in Sheffield, South Yorkshire
 S.L. Benfica, a Portuguese association football team
 Southern Miss Golden Eagles, the sports teams of Southern Mississippi University
 Surrey Eagles, a Tier II Junior "A" ice hockey team
 SWD Eagles, a rugby club in South Africa
 Tennessee Tech Golden Eagles, the sports teams of Tennessee Tech
 Tohoku Rakuten Golden Eagles, a Japanese Pacific League baseball team
 Turku Eagles, a Finnish rugby union team
 Washington Eagles, an Eastern Hockey League team that played from 1939 to 1942
 West Coast Eagles, an Australian Football League team
 Winthrop Eagles, the sports teams of Winthrop University
 Woodville-West Torrens Eagles, a South Australian National Football League team

Other uses
 Eagles (Squadron), a Pakistan Air Force squadron
 Eagles (surname)
 Eagles (card game), a collectible card game
 Fraternal Order of Eagles, a fraternal organization founded in 1898
 Emerging and growth-leading economies (EAGLEs), key emerging economies that are expected to lead global growth in the next decade
 The American Eagles, later name for professional wrestling tag-team The Nightmares

See also
 Eagle (disambiguation)
 Screaming Eagles (disambiguation)